{{safesubst:#invoke:RfD||2=Untitled Kevin Feige Star Wars film|month = March
|day = 16
|year = 2023
|time = 07:59
|timestamp = 20230316075903

|content=
REDIRECT List of Star Wars films#Unspecified projects

}}